Holiday Hills may refer to:

 The Holiday Hills in the U.S. state of Washington
 Holiday Hills, Illinois
 Holiday Hills, Delaware
 Holiday Hills, a 2021 EP by Canadian DJ duo Loud Luxury